The Tajikistan First League is the second division of the Tajikistan Football Federation.

Season events
On 13 April, the Tajikistan Football Federation announced the 12 teams that would participate in this seasons competition.

Teams

League table

Season statistics

References

Tajikistan First League seasons
1
Tajik